Kaduvakuzhy is a small village near Vembayam, in Thiruvananthapuram, Kerala, India.

References

Villages in Thiruvananthapuram district